This is a list of clubs that play Australian rules football in South Australia at the senior level.
Guide to abbreviations:
FC = Football Club
AFC = Australian Football Club (mainly used if in Queensland or NSW or outside Australia) / Amateur Football Club (mainly used in the other Australian States)
ARFC = Australian Rules Football Club

National Level

Australian Football League

State Level

South Australian National Football League

Metropolitan / Country Level

Adelaide Footy League previously South Australian Amateur Football League

Division 1
Gaza Football Club
Gepps Cross Football Club
Goodwood Saints Football Club
Henley Football Club
Modbury Football Club
Port District Football Club
Rostrevor OC Football Club
Sacred Heart OC Football Club
Salisbury North Football Club
Tea Tree Gully Football Club
Division 2
Adelaide University Football Club
Athelstone Football Club
Broadview Football Club
Eastern Park Football Club
Flinders Park Football Club
Kilburn Football Club
Payneham NU Football Club
Pembroke OS Football Club
PHOS Camden Football Club
Seaton Ramblers Football Club
Division 3
Mitcham Football Club
Old Ignatians Football Club
Para Hills Football Club
Portland Football Club
Salisbury Football Club
Scotch OC Football Club
SMOSH West Lakes Football Club
St Peter's OC Football Club
Walkerville Football Club
Woodville South Football Club
Division 4
Adelaide Lutheran Football Club
CBCOC Football Club
Edwardstown Football Club 
Fitzroy Football Club
Golden Grove Football Club
Greenacres Football Club
North Haven Football Club
Pooraka Football Club
Prince Alfred OC Football Club
Salisbury West Football Club
Unley Football Club
Division 5
Blackfriars OS Football Club
Elizabeth Football Club
Hope Valley Football Club
Ingle Farm Football Club
Kenilworth Football Club
Plympton Football Club
Pulteney Football Club
Rosewater Football Club
Smithfield Football Club
Westminster OS Football Club

Division 6
Brahma Lodge Football Club
Central United Football Club
Colonel Light Gardens Football Club
Glenunga Football Club
Hectorville Football Club
Lockleys Football Club
Mitchell Park Football Club
Paralowie Football Club
Trinity OS Football Club
West Croydon Football Club
Division 7
Adelaide University Football Club

Athelstone Football Club
Flinders University Football Club
Henley Football Club
Houghton Districts Football Club
North Pines Football Club
Ovingham Football Club
Sacred Heart OC Football Club
St Paul's OS Football Club

Adelaide Plains Football League
Angle Vale Football Club
Balaklava Football Club
Hamley Bridge Football Club
Hummocks Watchman Football Club
Mallala Football Club
Two Wells Football Club
United Football Club
Virginia Football Club

Barossa Light & Gawler Football Association

Angaston Football Club
Barossa District Football Club
Freeling Football Club
Gawler Central Football Club
Kapunda Football Club
Nuriootpa Football Club
South Gawler Football Club
Tanunda Football Club
Willaston Football Club

Eastern Eyre Football League

Cowell Football Club
Eastern Ranges Football Club
Kimba Districts Football Club
Ports Football Club

Far West Football League

Blues Football Club
Koonibba Football Club
Thevenard Football Club
Western United Football Club

Far North Football League

East Roxby Football Club
Hornridge Football Club
Olympic Dam Football Club
Roxby Districts Football Club

Great Flinders Football League

Cummins Kapinnie Football Club
Eyre United Football Club
Lock Football Club
Ramblers Football Club
Tumby Bay Football Club
United Yeelanna Football Club

Great Southern Football League

Encounter Bay Football Club
Goolwa Port Elliot Football Club
Langhorne Creek Football Club
McLaren Football Club
Mt Compass Football Club
Myponga-Sellicks Football Club
Strathalbyn Football Club
Victor Harbour Football Club
Willunga Football Club
Yankalilla Football Club

Hills Football League

Division 1
Blackwood Football Club
Echunga Football Club
Hahndorf Football Club
Lobethal Football Club
Mt Barker Football Club
Mt Lofty District Football Club
Onkaparinga Valley Football Club
Uraidla Districts Football Club

Division 2
Bridgewater-Callington Football Club
Gumeracha Football Club
Ironbank-Cherry Gardens Football Club
Kangarilla Football Club
Kersbrook Football Club
Macclesfield Football Club
Meadows Football Club
Nairne Bremer Football Club
Torrens Valley Football Club

Kangaroo Island Football League

Dudley United Football Club
Kingscote Football Club
Parndana Football Club
Western Districts Football Club
Wisanger Football Club

Kowree-Naracoorte-Tatiara Football League

 Border Districts Football Club
 Bordertown Football Club
 Keith Football Club
 Kaniva-Leeor Football Club
 Kingston Football Club
 Kybybolite Football Club
 Lucindale Football Club
 Mundulla Football Club
 Naracoorte Football Club
 Padthaway Football Club
 Penola Football Club

Mallee Football League

 Border Downs Tintinara Football Club
 Karoonda Football Club
 Lameroo Football Club
 Murrayville Football Club
 Peake & District Football Club
 Pinnaroo Football Club

Mid South Eastern Football League

Glencoe Football Club
Hatherleigh Football Club
Kalangadoo Football Club
Kongorong Football Club
Mt Burr Football Club
Nangwarry Football Club
Port MacDonnell Football Club
Robe Football Club
Tantanoola Football Club

Mid West Football League

Central Eyre Football Club
Elliston Football Club
West Coast Hawks Football Club
Western Districts Football Club
Wirrulla Football Club
Wudinna United Football Club

North Eastern Football League

Blyth Snowtown Football Club
Brinkworth Spalding Redhill Football Club
Burra Booborowie Hallett Football Club
Mintaro Manoora Football Club
North Clare Football Club
Riverton Saddleworth Marrabel United Football Club
South Clare Football Club
Southern Saints Football Club

Northern Areas Football Association

Booleroo Centre/Melrose/Wilmington Football Club
Broughton Mundoora Football Club
Crystal Brook Football Club
Jamestown Peterborough Football Club
Orroroo Football Club
Southern Flinders Football Club

Port Lincoln Football League

Boston Football Club
Lincoln South Football Club
Mallee Park Football Club
Marble Range Football Club
Tasman Football Club
Wayback Football Club

Riverland Football League

A Grade
 Berri Football Club
 Barmera-Monash Football Club
 Loxton Football Club
 Loxton North Football Club
 Renmark Football Club
 Waikerie Football Club

Independent Grade
 Blanchetown-Swan Reach Football Club
 Browns Well Football Club
 Cobdogla Football Club
 Lyrup Football Club
 Paringa Football Club
 Ramco Football Club
 Sedan Cambrai Football Club
 Wunkar Football Club

River Murray Football League

Imperial Football Club
Jervois Football Club
Mannum Football Club
Meningie Football Club
Mypolonga Football Club
Rambler Football Club
Tailem Bend Football Club

Southern Football League

Aldinga Football Club
Christies Beach Football Club
Cove Football Club
Flagstaff Hill Football Club
Happy Valley Football Club
Morphett Vale Football Club
Noarlunga Football Club
Port Noarlunga Football Club
Reynella Football Club

Spencer Gulf Football League

Central Augusta Football Club
Lions Football Club
Port Football Club
Solomontown Football Club
South Augusta Football Club
West Augusta Football Club

Whyalla Football League

Central Whyalla Football Club
North Whyalla Football Club
Roopeena Football Club
South Whyalla Football Club
Weeroona Bay Football Club
West Whyalla Football Club

Yorke Peninsula Football League

Ardrossan Football Club
Bute Football Club
Central Yorke Cougars Football Club
CMS Crows Football Club
Kadina Football Club
Moonta Football Club
Paskeville Football Club
Southern Eagles Football Club
Wallaroo Football Club

 
Australia clubs
Sporting clubs in South Australia